East Elgin Secondary School is a composite secondary school located in Aylmer, Ontario, Canada. It serves pupils from Aylmer and its surrounding areas. The school is part of the Thames Valley District School Board, formerly known as the Elgin County Board of Education.

History 
East Elgin Secondary School was founded in 1875. Since then, it had undergone several name changes. The Elgin County Council established the Aylmer High School District 1872. Classes started the following year in 1873 but a building on the present site was not constructed until 1886 and classes began in 1876. The building soon became too small for the number of students and another school was built on the same site in 1886.

See also 
 List of high schools in Ontario

References

External links 
 School's Official Website

High schools in Elgin County
1875 establishments in Canada